Events from the year 1788 in Spain

Events

 - Charles IV succeed to the throne. 
 - Capela de Ánimas

Births

Deaths

References

 
Years of the 18th century in Spain